"If I Say Yes" is a 1986 single by British pop group Five Star, and was the follow-up to their biggest-ever UK single, the #2 ranked "Rain or Shine". It was the fourth release from the group's Silk & Steel album. A 3:43 remixed version of the song (an edit of the cassette-only "Lew Hahn New York Remix"), which was the version released in the U.S., appeared on the group's 1989 Greatest Hits album.

Track listing
7” Single and Five Star logo shaped picture disc:

1. "If I Say Yes"

2. "Let Me Down Easy"

12” Single: PT40982

1. "If I Say Yes" (Extended Mix) (Phil Harding PWL Mix) 7:05

2. "Let Me Down Easy"

3. "Can’t Wait Another Minute" (M&M New York Remix) 8:36

2nd 12” Single: PT40982R

1. "If I Say Yes" (Urban Remix) (Shep Pettibone Mix) 5:45

2. "If I Say Yes" (Dub Mix) (Shep Pettibone Mix) 6:05

3. "Let Me Down Easy"

4. "Can’t Wait Another Minute" (M&M New York Remix) 8:36

All tracks available on the remastered versions of either the 2010 'Silk & Steel' album, the 2013 'The Remix Anthology (The Remixes 1984-1991)' or the 2018 'Luxury - The Definitive Anthology 1984-1991' boxset.

Chart history
"If I Say Yes" reached #15 (UK); #13 (US Soul Chart)

References

Five Star songs
1986 singles
Songs written by Michael Margules
Songs written by Marvin Morrow
RCA Records singles
1986 songs